Hypsibius is a genus of tardigrades in the class Eutardigrada.

Genome sequencing
The genome of Hypsibius dujardini has been sequenced. Hypsibius dujardini has a compact genome and a generation time of about two weeks. It can be cultured indefinitely and cryopreserved. This sequenced strain has been redesignated Hypsibius exemplaris since 2018.

Species
The genus includes the following species:

 Hypsibius allisoni Horning, Schuster and Grigarick, 1978
 Hypsibius americanus (Packard, 1873)
 Hypsibius antonovae (Biserov 1990)
 Hypsibius arcticus (Murray 1907)
 Hypsibius biscuitiformis Bartos, 1960
 Hypsibius calcaratus Bartos, 1935
 Hypsibius camelopardalis Ramazzotti and Maucci, 1983
 Hypsibius conifer Mihelcic, 1938
 Hypsibius convergens (Urbanowicz, 1925)
 Hypsibius dujardini (Doyère, 1840)
 Hypsibius exemplaris (Gąsiorek, 2018)
 Hypsibius fuhrmanni (Heinis, 1914)
 Hypsibius giusepperamazzotti Sudzuki, 1975
 Hypsibius heardensis Miller, McInnes and Bergstrom, 2005
 Hypsibius hypostomus Bartos, 1935
 Hypsibius iharosi Bartos, 1941
 Hypsibius janetscheki Ramazzotti 1968
 Hypsibius klebelsbergi Mihelcic 1959
 Hypsibius macrocalcaratus Beasley, 1988
 Hypsibius maculatus Iharos, 1969
 Hypsibius marcelli Pilato, 1990
 Hypsibius microps Thulin, 1928
 Hypsibius morikawai Ito, 1995
 Hypsibius multituberculatus Pilato, Binda and Lisi, 2003
 Hypsibius novaezeelandiae Pilato and Binda, 1997
 Hypsibius pachyunguis Maucci, 1996
 Hypsibius pallidus Thulin, 1911
 Hypsibius pedrottii Bertolani, Manicardi and Gibertoni, 1987
 Hypsibius pradellii Bertolani and Rebecchi, 1996
 Hypsibius ragonesei Binda and Pilato, 1985
 Hypsibius roanensis Nelson and McGlothlin, 1993
 Hypsibius runae Bartos, 1941
 Hypsibius scaber Maucci, 1987
 Hypsibius scabropygus Cuénot, 1929
 Hypsibius septulatus Pilato, Binda, Napolitano and Moncada, 2004
 Hypsibius seychellensis Pilato, Binda and Lisi, 2006
 Hypsibius simoizumii Sudzuki, 1964
 Hypsibius stiliferus Abe, 2004
 Hypsibius thaleri Dastych, 2004
 Hypsibius vaskelae Tumanov
 Hypsibius zetlandicus (Murray, 1907)

References

External links
 Tardigrada Newsletter
 Tardigrades – Pictures and Movies
 The Edinburgh Tardigrade project
 NJ Tardigrade Survey
  Tardigrades (English/German)
 

Hypsibiidae
Tardigrade genera
Polyextremophiles
Taxa named by Christian Gottfried Ehrenberg